The Battle of Tornow was fought between the forces of Prussia and Sweden on 26 September 1758 during the Seven Years' War, near modern-day Fürstenberg/Havel (then called Tornow, in the Grand Duchy of Mecklenburg-Strelitz).

The Prussians sent 6,000 men, led by General Carl Heinrich von Wedel, to protect Berlin. Wedel attacked aggressively and ordered his cavalry to attack a Swedish force of some 600 men at Tornow. The Swedes bravely fought off six assaults, but the majority of the Swedish cavalry was lost, and the Swedish infantry had to retreat before the stronger Prussian forces.

The Prussian-Swedish battles continued at the Battle of Fehrbellin on 28 September 1758.

References 

Battle of Tornow
Battles of the Seven Years' War
Battles involving Prussia
Battles involving Sweden
Battles in Brandenburg
1758 in the Holy Roman Empire